Sinclair Building or Sinclair Oil Building may refer to:

Sinclair Centre, Vancouver, British Columbia
Smulekoffs Furniture Store, Cedar Rapids, Iowa, formerly known as the Sinclair Building
Sinclair, Rooney & Co. Building, Buffalo, New York
600 Fifth Avenue at Rockefeller Center, Manhattan, New York, formerly known as the Sinclair Oil Building 
Liberty Tower (Manhattan), New York, formerly known as the Sinclair Oil Building
Sinclair House (Manhattan hotel)
Sinclair Building (Tulsa, Oklahoma)
Sinclair Building (Fort Worth), Texas

See also
Sinclair Oil Corporation
Sinclair Service Station (disambiguation)
Sinclair House (disambiguation)